Kenanga Wholesale City (also known as KWC Fashion Mall), is Malaysia's first fashion wholesale mall. It is located in Pudu, the heart of Kuala Lumpur, a few minutes from the city's Golden Triangle, in the fashion wholesale area of Jalan Kenanga.

KWC Fashion Mall has  of net lettable space and houses more than 800 wholesale and retail shops as well as boutiques selling a range of fashion-related merchandise including women's, men's and children's apparel, accessories, shoes and leather goods.

Starstage@KWC is a  purpose-built concert hall and event space located at Level 15 of the mall. It had hosted several concerts and events such as Indonesian pop-rock band Ungu “Tercipta Untukku” Live in Malaysia in February 2014, Korean actor Lee Kwang Soo Fan Meeting in January 2014, Korean actor and singer Lee Min Ho Concert in June 2013, Malaysian International Gourmet Festival (MGIF) in November 2013, TVBStar Awards Malaysia in December 2013 and Mandopop boy band Super Junior M in 2012.

KWC Fashion Mall is endorsed by Tourism Malaysia as a Kuala Lumpur Must Visit Destination.

The Grand Opening of KWC Fashion Mall took place on 26 May 2012, with Korean superstar band Block B, Malaysian rock band Hujan and other big names from entertainment and fashion in attendance.

Transportation
The shopping mall is accessible within walking distance southwest of Hang Tuah Station.

See also
 List of shopping malls in Malaysia

References

2011 establishments in Malaysia
Shopping malls established in 2011
Shopping malls in Kuala Lumpur